This is a list of notable Jewish American economists. For other Jewish Americans, see Lists of Jewish Americans.

References

External links
 Jewish winners of the Nobel Prize are listed in the Jewish Virtual Library.
 Jinfo

Economists
Economists
Jewish American